Thomas Larsson (born 1964 in Falun, Sweden) is a Swedish guitarist and songwriter, perhaps most famous for his work with singer Glenn Hughes and with the band Baltimoore. He has also released a few solo albums.

Biography
Larsson started playing the guitar at the age of twelve, after receiving his first guitar as a gift from his parents for his twelve birthday. He would join his first serious band at the age of 17 in 1982, Six Feet Under (not to be confused with the American band of the same name), which also featured future Baltimoore bandmate Björn Lodin. The band dissolved after two albums in 1994. Larsson would then work as a freelance guitarist, including working on the first Baltimoore album, There's no Danger on the Roof, in 1989, and he went on to record one album with Swedish band Yeah Bop Station. Larsson was working with the short-lived Swedish band King Siguurd, when he was approached to join Glenn Hughes' backing band, which he accepted. He left Hughes' band when his daughter Cornelia was born.

Larsson's first solo album, Freeride, was released in 1996 in Japan. He had been approached to record a solo album by Zero Corporation during a tour in Asia with Glenn Hughes. The album would eventually be released in Europe and other markets as well, in 2000.

In 2000, Larsson rejoined Baltimoore for their first album since 1994, Original Sin. He would stay with the band until 2003, only to once more rejoin the band in 2006 for their latest release, X. 2006 also saw the release of his second solo album, Harmonic Passion.

Larsson is also a member of Boccabandet, a sought-after Swedish cover band.

Discography

With Six Feet Under
 Six Feet Under (1983)
 Eruption (1984)

With Baltimoore
 There's no Danger on the Roof (1989)
 Original Sin (2000)
 The Best of Baltimoore (2001)
 Ultimate Tribute (2003)
 X (2006)

With Glenn Hughes
 From Now On... (1994)
 Burning Japan Live (1994)

Solo releases
 Freeride (1996 / 2000)
 Harmonic Passion (2006)

Others
 Yeah Bop Station - Upfront (1990)

References

External links
Thomas Larsson's official website
Thomas Larsson's MySpace page

1964 births
Living people
People from Falun
Swedish rock guitarists
Swedish heavy metal guitarists
Baltimoore members